Pocockia is a monotypic genus of millipedes belonging to the family Metopidiotrichidae. It contains one species, Pocockia sapiens .

References

Chordeumatida
Millipede genera